Changlong Subdistrict is a subdistrict in Changsha County, Hunan Province, China. It was formed on September 28, 2012 from parts of Huanghua Town. The subdistrict is surrounded by Huanghua to the north, the east and the south, adjacent to Xingsha Subdistrict in the west. Changlong Subdistrict is divided into three villages and two communities; Its administrative centre is Xingfujiayuan.

References

Divisions of Changsha County
Changsha County
Populated places established in 2012
2012 establishments in China